Green rust is a generic name for various green crystalline chemical compounds containing iron(II) and iron(III) cations, the hydroxide anion, and another anion such as carbonate, chloride, or sulfate, in a layered double hydroxide structure.   The most studied varieties are

 carbonate green rust - GR(): [()12]2+ · [·2]2−.
 chloride green rust - GR(): [()8]+ · [·n]−.
 sulfate green rust - GR(): [()12]2+ · [·2]2−.

Other varieties reported in the literature are bromide , fluoride , iodide , nitrate , and selenate.

Green rust was first recognized as a corrosion crust on iron and steel surfaces. It occurs in nature as the mineral fougerite.

Structure

The crystal structure of green rust can be understood as the result of inserting the foreign anions and water molecules between brucite-like layers of iron(II) hydroxide,2. The latter has an hexagonal structure, with layer sequence AcBAcB... Each triple layer AcB, which is electrically neutral in the hydroxide, becomes positively charged. The anions then intercalate between those triple layers and restore neutrality.

There are two basic structures of green rust, "type 1" and "type 2".  Type 1 is exemplified by the chloride and carbonate varieties.  It has a rhombohedral crystal structure similar to that of pyroaurite.  The layers are stacked in the sequence AcBiBaCjCbAkA ...; where A, B, and C represent  planes, a, b, and c are layers of mixed  and  cations, and i, j, and k are layers of the intercalated anions and water molecules. The c crystallographic parameter is 22.5-22.8 Å for the carbonate, and about 24 Å for the chloride.

Type 2 green rust is exemplified by the sulfate variety.  It has a hexagonal crystal structure, with layers probably stacked in the sequence AcBiAbCjA...

Chemical properties

In oxidizing environment, green rust generally turns into  oxyhydroxides, namely α- (goethite) and γ- (lepidocrocite).

Oxidation of the carbonate variety can be retarded by wetting the material with hydroxyl-containing compounds such as glycerol or glucose, even though they do not penetrate the structure.   Some variety of green rust is stabilized also by an atmosphere with high  partial pressure.

Depending on the cations in the solution, the nitrate anions replaced the sulfate in the intercalation layer, before the reduction. It was conjectured that green rust may be formed in the reducing alkaline conditions below the surface of marine sediments and may be connected to the disappearance of oxidized species like nitrate in that environment.

Suspensions of carbonate green rust and orange γ- in water will react over a few days produce a black precipitate of magnetite .

Occurrence

Iron and steel corrosion
Green rust compounds were identified in green corrosion crusts that form on iron and steel surfaces, in alternating aerobic and anaerobic conditions, by water containing anions such as chloride, sulfate, carbonate, or bicarbonate.  They are believed to be intermediates in the oxidative corrosion of iron to form iron(III) oxyhydroxides (ordinary brown rust).  The green rust may be formed either directly from metallic iron or from iron(II) hydroxide2 .

Soil
On the basis of Mössbauer spectroscopic analysis, green rust minerals are suspected to occur as minerals in certain bluish-green soils that are formed in alternating redox conditions, and turn ochre once exposed to air.  The green rust has been conjectured to be present in the form of the mineral fougerite.

Biologically mediated formation
This process has been conjectured to occur in soil solutions and aquifers.

In one experiment, a 160 mM suspension of orange lepidocrocite γ- in a solution containing formate, incubated for 3 days with a culture of S. putrefaciens, turned dark green due to the conversion of the hydroxide to GR(), in the form of hexagonal platelets with diameter ~7 µm.  In this process, the formate was oxidized to bicarbonate  which provided the carbonate anions for the formation of the green rust.  The live bacteria were shown to be necessary for the formation of the green rust.

Laboratory preparation

Air oxidation methods
Green rust compounds can be synthesized at ordinary ambient temperature and pressure, from solutions containing iron(II) cations, hydroxide anions, and the appropriate intercalatory anions, such as chloride, sulfate, or carbonate.

The result is a suspension of ferrous hydroxide2 in a solution of the third anion. This suspension is oxidized by stirring in air, or bubbling air through it.

One method first combines an iron(II) salt with sodium hydroxide  to form the ferrous hydroxide suspension.  Then the sodium salt of the third anion is added, and the suspension is oxidized by stirring in air.

For example, carbonate green rust can be prepared by mixing solutions of iron(II) sulfate  and sodium hydroxide; then adding sufficient amount of sodium carbonate  solution, followed by the air oxidation step.

The production of green rust is reduced as temperature increases.

Stoichometric Fe(II) - Fe(III) methods

An alternate preparation of carbonate green rust first creates a suspension of iron(III) hydroxide3 in an iron(II) chloride  solution, and bubbles carbon dioxide through it.

No oxidation step is then necessary.

Electrochemistry

Carbonate green rust films have also been obtained from the electrochemical oxidation of iron plates.

References

Unspecifc references:

Corrosion